Sometimes They Drop By is the second EP by The Raveonettes, and was released on 23 September 2008. It is the first release in a three-part release of digital download EPs over three months.

Track listing

References

2008 EPs
The Raveonettes albums
Vice Records albums